Awards and decorations of Mongolia are governed by the laws of Mongolia on awards.

History

Early awards 
Titles in Mongolia have a history dating back to the time of the Mongol Empire. For example, the title of Baatar (“Hero”) was traditionally awarded to military leaders. At the beginning of the 20th Century, Russia played a key role in establishing Mongolia's independence from China. To honour this contribution, the Order of the Vajra (translated as the “Order of the Precious Rod”) was created for Mongolian nobility and foreigners, the latter were almost exclusively Russians. The order was abolished after the Mongolian Revolution of 1921.

Communist era 
Later on during the Cold War, state awards returned to the mainstream, with Mongolian designs being patterned off of the Soviet model. Many of the higher Mongolian awards were also manufactured in the Soviet Union.  In 1936, the new Mongolian state had formally enshrined the title of “Hero” by law, and in 1941, the “Badge of the Hero” was established. In 1956 the Hero of Labor Golden Soyombo Medal was added to the Mongolian awards system. A unique title, known as "Honorary Freeman of the Mongolian People’s Republic" was for Soviet leader Leonid Brezhnev to commemorate his visit to Ulaanbaatar in 1974.

Post-communism 
Unlike the situation after the fall of the soviet union, the communist-era awards of the Mongolian People's Republic were not abolished after the Mongolian Revolution of 1990, with many being awarded to this day.

Mongolia (since 1990)

Titles 

 Hero of Labour of Mongolia

Orders 

 Order of Genghis Khan
 Order of Sukhbaatar
 Order of Mother Heroine, 1st Class
 Order of Mother Heroine, 2nd Class
 Order of the Polar Star
 Order of the Precious Wand

Honorary Titles 

 People's Artist of Mongolia
People's Writer of Mongolia
 Honorary Medal of Combat
Honored Service Officer

Mongolian People's Republic (1923-1990)

Titles 

 Hero of the Mongolian People's Republic
 Hero of Labour of the Mongolian People's Republic

Order 

 Order of Military Merit
 Order of the Red Banner
 Order of the Red Banner of Labour

Honorary Titles 

 Honorary Freeman of the Mongolian People's Republic

Prizes 

 Natsagdorj Literary Prize
 Choibalsan Prize (Established in 1945 and renamed as the State Prize in 1962)

Jubilee medals 

 Medal "30 years of the Victory in Khalkhin-Gol"
 Medal "40 years of the Victory in Khalkhin-Gol"
 Medal "50 Years of the Mongolian People's Revolution"

 Medal "For the Victory over Japan"
 Medal "30 year anniversary of the Victory over Japan"
 Medal "25th Anniversary of Mongolian People's Revolution"
 Medal "50 years of the Mongolian People's Republic"
 Medal "50 years of the Mongolian People's Army"

See also 

 Awards and decorations of the Russian Federation

References 

Orders, decorations, and medals of Mongolia